Malmö FF competed in Division 2 Södra for the 1928–29 season.

Club

Other information

References
 

Malmö FF seasons
Malmo FF